Nothing at All is a 1941 picture book by Wanda Gag. The story is about an invisible dog named Nothing at All and his attempts to turn visible. The book was a recipient of a 1942 Caldecott Honor for its illustrations.

References

1941 children's books
American picture books
Caldecott Honor-winning works
Coward-McCann books